Tapunuu Niko Lee Hang (1953/1954 – 29 November 2022) was a Samoan politician and Cabinet Minister. He was a member of the Human Rights Protection Party.

Hang was an accountant by profession and a former Public Trustee. He was educated at Waikato University in New Zealand and the University of New England in Australia.  He was first elected to the Legislative Assembly of Samoa as one of two  parliamentary representatives reserved for Individual Voters in a by-election in December 2001. In January 2002 he was appointed Parliamentary Under Secretary to Minister of Justice. In 2004 he was appointed Parliamentary Under Secretary to minister of Revenue. He was re-elected at the 2006 election and appointed Minister of Finance. He was re-elected again in the 2011 election, but replaced as Finance Minister by Faumuina Tiatia Liuga. From 2012 to 2014 Hang opposed plans to replace the individual voter seats with two urban seats.

After serving a term as a backbencher, he was re-appointed to Cabinet following the 2016 election as Minister of Works Transport and Infrastructure. In September 2018 he claimed that the chief executive of the Ministry of Works, Afamasaga Su’a Pou Onesemo, had been fired for poor management. He retracted the claim two days later. 

Following the abolition of his urban voters seat he contested the new seat of Vaimauga No. 3  in the 2021 Samoan general election and was re-elected.

Tapunuu died at Tupua Tamasese Meaole National Hospital in Motoʻotua on 29 November 2022, at the age of 68.

References

1950s births
2022 deaths
Samoan people of Chinese descent
Members of the Legislative Assembly of Samoa
Finance ministers of Samoa
Government ministers of Samoa
University of Waikato alumni
University of New England (Australia) alumni
Samoan civil servants
Year of birth missing
21st-century Samoan politicians